Anousjka van Exel (born 5 October 1974) is a Dutch former tennis player.

Career
She competed in tennis for Tulsa Golden Hurricane.

She won a total of eleven ITF titles during her career and reached a doubles ranking high of world number 100 in May 2002, after reaching the third round of the women's doubles at the Australian Open earlier that year.

ITF finals

Singles (3–6)

Doubles (8–4)

Unplayed final

References

External links
 
 
 

1974 births
Living people
Dutch female tennis players
People from Heerhugowaard
Tulsa Golden Hurricane women's tennis players
Sportspeople from North Holland
20th-century Dutch women
21st-century Dutch women